The women's marathon event at the 2016 Summer Olympics took place on 14 August on the Sambadrome.

Summary
The pack stayed bunched, with Mare Dibaba, Visiline Jepkesho, Rose Chelimo, Volha Mazuronak and Tirfi Tsegaye each taking their turns in the spotlight. The racing got serious, the pack was down to seven at 30 kilometres with American Desiree Linden the closest pursuer but unable to get back with the group. Shalane Flanagan was consistently toward the back of the group, then she began to fall off. As Flanagan and Mazuronak struggled with the group, the remaining five African runners surged, the gap grew. Chelimo was the next to drop off the group.

Eunice Kirwa never held the lead and Jemima Sumgong only asserted herself in the last 5 kilometers. When she did the pack strung out to a straight line, former race walker Mazuronak and Tsegaye falling off the back. At a water station, Dibaba was the last to fall off, and then there were two. World Championship bronze medalist and Nagoya Champion Kirwa shadowing London Champion Sumgong until the final kilometer. Then Sumgong expanded the gap in the long final straight into the finish.

Three sets of twins finished the marathon; two of the Luik triplets from Estonia, the Hahner twins from Germany and the Kim sisters from North Korea.

The medals were presented by Nawal El Moutawakel, IOC member, Morocco and Hiroshi Yokokawa, Council Member of the IAAF.

Records
, the existing world and Olympic records were as follows:

Schedule
All times are Brasília Time (UTC−3).

Results

References

Women's marathon
Marathons at the Olympics
Summer Olympics
2016 Summer Olympics
2016 in women's athletics
Women's events at the 2016 Summer Olympics